Hanna Szujó (born 15 February 2004) is a Hungarian artistic gymnast who represented Hungary at the inaugural Junior World Championships.

Early life 
Hanna Szujó was born in Békéscsaba, Hungary on 15 February 2004.  Her older sister Dorka is also a gymnast.

Gymnastics career

Espoir

2016
Szujó competed at the Eva Kanyo Cup in the espoir division.  She won the all-around and also placed first on vault and balance beam, second on floor exercise, and third on uneven bars.  She next competed at the Győr Trophy where she placed twelfth in the all-around, fifth on vault, and fourth on floor exercise.

2017 
In April 2017 Szujó competed at the Elek Matolay Memorial where she placed sixth in the all-around and on vault, fifth on floor exercise, and second on balance beam.  She next competed at the Hungarian Master Championships where she placed eighth in the all-around and fifth on uneven bars.

Junior

2018
In May Szujó competed at the Elek Matolay Memorial where she placed first in the junior all-around and on floor exercise.  Additionally she placed second on uneven bars behind Zója Székely and fifth on balance beam.  In June she competed at Gym Festival Trnava where she placed fifth in the all-around and third on balance beam behind Anastasia Bachynska and Ioana Stănciulescu.  She next competed in a friendly competition where she helped the Hungarian junior team win gold and individually she placed third in the all-around.

In August Szujó represented Hungary at the 2018 European Championships alongside Csenge Bácskay, Regina Medved, Bianka Schermann, and Székely; they placed ninth.  At the Hungarian Championships Szujó only competed on uneven bars where she finished third.  In October she competed at the Salamunov Memorial competition where she placed first in the all-around and on all four apparatuses.  She ended the season competing at the Olympic Hopes Cup where she placed first in the all-around, second on floor exercise, third on balance beam, and fourth on vault.

2019
Szujó began the year competing at the Elek Matolay Memorial, International GymSport, and Gym Festival Trnava.  She was selected to represent Hungary at the inaugural Junior World Championships alongside Mirtill Makovits and Nikolett Szilágyi; they finished sixteenth as a team and individually Szujó placed 42nd in the all-around.  Szujó next competed at the European Youth Olympic Festival alongside Makovits.  They finished seventh as a team and Szujó finished 16th in the all-around.  Szujó ended the year competing at the Olympic Hopes Cup where she helped Hungary finish third.  Individually she finished twelfth in the all-around and seventh on vault and floor exercise.

Senior

2020–21 
Szujó turned senior in 2020.  Most competitions were canceled or postponed due to the global COVID-19 pandemic.  In October Szujó competed at the Hungarian Championships where she placed third in the all-around, fifth on vault, second on balance beam, and third on floor exercise.

In 2021 Szujó returned to international competition at the Varna Challenge Cup where she won gold on floor exercise, tied with Dildora Aripova.  Additionally she competed at the Osijek and Koper Challenge Cups; however she did not win any medals.  She competed at the Flanders International Team Challenge where she helped Hungary place ninth as a team.  Individually she won silver on vault behind compatriot Csenge Bácskay.

Competitive history

References

External links 
 

2004 births
Living people
Hungarian female artistic gymnasts
People from Békéscsaba
Sportspeople from Békés County
21st-century Hungarian women